Radio Ramadan is a type of Islamic radio which operates exclusively during the Ramadan period in the UK. Many cities that have significant Muslim populations individually fund these stations and they run a number of broadcasts including Quran recitation and Nasheeds.

The Radio Ramadan stations currently operating in the UK in Ramadan 2023CE (1443AH) include:

Ramadan Radio Leicester (87.9FM)
Ramadan Radio London (87.9FM)

Islamic radio stations in the United Kingdom
Ramadan